The Grameenphone Prothom Alo Sports Awards ceremony that takes place annually since 2005. The award jury formed by five reputed sports persons of country.

The five categories for the award are as follows..
 Grameenphone - Prothom Alo Sports Person of the Year
 Grameenphone - Prothom Alo Sports Runners-up of the Year
 Grameenphone - Prothom Alo Sport Woman of the Year
 Grameenphone - Prothom Alo Sports Lifetime award of the Year
 Grameenphone - Prothom Alo Best Emerging sports Person of the Year

The winners of Lifetime Achievement and Sportsperson of the Year each received Tk 1 lakh and the other winners got Tk 50,000 each.

Winners

Sports Person of the year

Woman of the year

Lifetime award of the Year

Best Emerging award of the Year

References 

Asian sports trophies and awards